Esther Pauline Cox Todd (March 10, 1895 – October 3, 1971) was an American composer, music educator, and organist.

Todd was born in Colfax, Washington, to Horace Mann and Joie Lester Hamer Cox.  She married Wesley Sanford Todd on June 29, 1920, and they had one son, Horace.

Todd studied music at Willamette University. She belonged to the Society of Oregon Composers, the Oregon Music Teachers Association, and Phi Beta.

In 1921, Todd worked as the head of the Lewiston State Normal School music department. She later served as dean of the Oregon chapter of the American Guild of Organists, and co-directed the Todd School of Music. After her fellow composer Jeanette Tillett died in 1965, Todd promoted and sold Tillett's compositions.

Todd's works were published in professional journals and by Krinke Music Publications Inc. and Willis Music Co. Her publications included:

Articles 

Basic Pieces in the Student's Repertoire (published in The Etude, Feb 1947)

Why Not Get Up a Summer Music Play (published in The Etude, Mar 1945)

Chamber 

Summer on Larch Mountain (violin and piano)

Musical Theatre 

Hudson's Bay Man (with Jean B. Foster)

Orchestra 

Western Sketches

Piano 
Five Swans

Frolicsome Friskies (with Harry Krinke)

Little Red Ski Train

Salty Sails

Spanish Whim

Vocal 

Songs

References 

American women composers
American composers
American music educators
1895 births
1971 deaths
People from Colfax, Washington